Arrowhead Farms is an unincorporated community of San Bernardino County, California. It is now a foothill and rural neighborhood of the city of San Bernardino located just northeast of the Interstate 215 and Interstate 210 junction. Arrowhead Farms is in the 92407 ZIP Code and is within the 909 area code.

References

External links
postal zip code
Farms map

Unincorporated communities in San Bernardino County, California
Unincorporated communities in California